Charles Nevill(e) may refer to:

Charles Neville, 6th Earl of Westmorland (1543–1601), English nobleman and one of the leaders of the Rising of the North in 1569
Charles Neville (musician) (1938–2018), American saxophonist with The Neville Brothers
Charles Neville (UDF), see 1981 in the Irish Republican Army 
Charles William Nevill (1815–1888), British Member of Parliament for Carmarthen, 1874–1876
Charles Neville, 5th Baron Braybrooke (1823–1902), British peer